A Wisconsin state park is an area of land in the U.S. state of Wisconsin preserved by the state for its natural, historic, or other resources. The state park system in Wisconsin includes both state parks and state recreation areas. Each unit was created by an act of the Wisconsin Legislature and is maintained by the Wisconsin Department of Natural Resources, Division of Parks and Recreation. The Division of Forestry manages a further  in Wisconsin's state forests.

Several Wisconsin state parks contain resources that have been recognized on a national level. Chippewa Moraine State Recreation Area, Devil's Lake State Park, and Interstate State Park are units of the Ice Age National Scientific Reserve, while the Wyalusing Hardwood Forest in Wyalusing State Park is a National Natural Landmark.  Two Wisconsin state parks contain National Historic Landmarks, both of which are Native American archaeological sites: Aztalan and Copper Culture.  15 state parks contain a total of 23 separate listings on the National Register of Historic Places (NRHP).  These are the two previously mentioned National Historic Landmarks, plus Lake Farms Archaeological District at Capital Springs State Recreation Area, Copper Falls State Park, six individual buildings at Heritage Hill State Historical Park (Baird Law Office, Cotton House, Fort Howard Hospital, Fort Howard Officers' Quarters, Fort Howard Ward Building, and Tank Cottage), High Cliff Mounds at High Cliff State Park, the Seth Peterson Cottage in Mirror Lake State Park, the Raddatz Rockshelter at Natural Bridge State Park, Stonefield partially within Nelson Dewey State Park, Eagle Bluff Lighthouse in Peninsula State Park, the Roche-a-Cri Petroglyphs in Roche-a-Cri State Park, the shot tower in Tower Hill State Park, Whitefish Dunes-Bay View Site in Whitefish Dunes State Park, Wyalusing State Park Mounds Archaeological District in Wyalusing State Park, and four listings in Rock Island State Park: the Pottawatomie Lighthouse, Rock Island Historic District, Thordarson Estate Historic District, and a water tower.

History 
Wisconsin became the first state to have a state park in 1878 when it formed "The State Park". The state owned , which was less than 10% of the total area. There were few residents in the area. Lumber barons were powerful in the area, and they purchased 2/3 of the state's land at $8 per acre. This defeated the purpose of the parks for it didn't save the land from the ax.

In 1895, the state legislature created an act which authorized the state governor to examine some land in Polk County at the Dalles of the St. Croix River to become a state park. In 1899, the legislature approved the purchase of Interstate State Park and it was established on September 20, 1900. Architect John Nolen was hired in 1907 to draft a feasibility plan for a Wisconsin State Parks System and State Parks for Wisconsin was released later that year. The report was the guideline used to set up the state park system. It recommended the creation of four state parks: Dells of the Wisconsin River, Devil's Lake, Door County's Fish Creek (now Peninsula State Park) and the confluence of the Mississippi and Wisconsin Rivers (now Wyalusing State Park). Three became state parks, and the fourth became Dells Natural Area in 2005. A State Conservation Commission was formed in 1915 by combining the State Park Board, the State Board of Forestry, the Fisheries Commission, and the state Game Warden Department.

List of Wisconsin state parks and recreation areas

List of former Wisconsin state parks

See also 
 List of Wisconsin state forests

References

External links 

Wisconsin State Park System

 
Wisconsin state parks
State parks